Manuel "Manolo" Ruiz Hierro (born 8 February 1962) is a Spanish former professional footballer who played as a central defender.

He amassed La Liga totals of 175 matches and seven goals over ten seasons, representing mainly Tenerife (four years) and Málaga (three).

Playing career
Born in Vélez-Málaga, Andalusia, Hierro started playing professionally with local CD Málaga, but only totalled 26 games for the first team in his first five seasons, also suffering La Liga relegation in the last one. After one more year in the Segunda División, he joined Real Valladolid of the top division.

After helping the Castile and León side finish eighth in his second season, with one of the best defensive records in the competition (38 matches, 34 goals), Hierro signed for FC Barcelona, but only lasted a few months in Catalonia, moving to Real Betis on loan. Suffering top-flight relegation with the Verdiblancos, he subsequently joined CD Tenerife– also in the top tier and on loan – and retired from football at 32, having amassed professional totals of 206 games and 11 goals.

Post-retirement
After retiring as a player, Hierro served as director of football to his first team – now renamed Málaga CF – for several seasons. In early 2006, following the dismissal of Antonio Tapia, he was named head coach, as the club was eventually relegated from the first division and he was relieved of his duties as both director and manager.

Personal life
Hierro was the second of three siblings who were all footballers, and defenders. His older brother, Antonio, played almost exclusively for Málaga, while the youngest, Fernando, represented mainly Real Madrid and scored more than 20 goals for the Spain national team.

From 1980 to 1986 Manuel and Antonio played together in Málaga, and Fernando was Manuel's teammate at Valladolid for one season.

References

External links

1962 births
Living people
People from Vélez-Málaga
Sportspeople from the Province of Málaga
Spanish footballers
Footballers from Andalusia
Association football defenders
La Liga players
Segunda División players
Atlético Malagueño players
CD Málaga footballers
Real Valladolid players
FC Barcelona players
Real Betis players
CD Tenerife players
Spain under-21 international footballers
Spain under-23 international footballers
Spanish football managers
La Liga managers
Segunda División B managers
Málaga CF managers
CD Puertollano managers